Andre Buitendag (born circa 1962), is a Zimbabwean rugby union player who played as centre.

Career
At club level, Buitendag for the Mashonaland provincial team alongside Andy Ferreira, Malcolm Jellicoe, Neville Kloppers, Dirk Buitendag, Alex Nicholls, who would play alongside him for Zimbabwe at the 1987 Rugby World Cup. Buitendag represented Zimbabwe at the 1987 Rugby World Cup, playing the pool stage matches against Romania and Scotland.

References

External links
Andre Buitendag international stats

1962 births
Zimbabwean rugby union players
Rugby union centres
White Zimbabwean sportspeople
Living people